Özgörüsh is a village in Talas Region of Kyrgyzstan. It is part of Bakay-Ata District. Its population was 6,081 in 2021.

Population

References

Populated places in Talas Region